The palang, or ampallang is a male genital piercing that penetrates horizontally through the entire glans of the penis.

History

Penis piercings of proto-Malay origin predated European contact with tribes in (among others) the Philippines and Borneo (Dayak people). Thomas Cavendish claims that in the Philippines the practice was an invention of the women to prevent sodomy (the Philippines variant included a spur).

In Western culture, the ampallang became popular along with the many genital piercings practiced amongst the gay BDSM community prior to the establishment of the body piercing industry in the 1980s and 1990s. Due to its supposed authenticity, this piercing is closely associated with the modern primitive movement but anatomy and use of a palang differs drastically from a modern ampallang. Indeed, traditional palang design is simply a pin used to attach a wooden glans cape extension to the penis.

Procedure
The piercing may be transurethral (passing through the urethra) and named as the European ampallang, whereas the American ampallang is placed horizontally above the urethra, generally back toward the corona. A variant on this piercing is the shaft ampallang, which penetrates the shaft of the penis horizontally at any point along its length. The counterpart to this piercing is the apadravya, which penetrates the glans vertically. The combination of an ampallang and an apadravya is sometimes referred to as the magic cross.

Health issues 
Ampallang is an advanced piercing, and the procedure can be extremely painful. Full healing usually takes between four and six months, but can take a year or more in an American ampallang.

The primary health issues related to this piercing are during the procedure itself and during the healing process. Depending on the placement, there can be a significant amount of blood loss, both during the procedure and during the initial healing process. The measurement for the piercing jewelry is typically done by the receiver in private on his erect penis, while the actual piercing is done on his flaccid penis. The long healing process requires that the bearer abstain from sexual intercourse for a lengthy period of time, on the order of six weeks to six months.

It is possible for this piercing to injure or damage the teeth and soft palate of the giving party during oral sex.

If this piercing is transurethral ("European"), it can divert the flow of urine, forcing the bearer to sit down or take other measures during urination. The piercing will leave a tube of scar tissue, which will remain even if the jewelry is removed and the piercing allowed to heal.

Functions
Ampallang, once healed, is often pleasurable to the bearer because it stimulates the internal penis tissues.

Jewelry 
Straight barbells are almost exclusively worn in ampallangs, both initially and after they are healed. Jewelry must be long enough to accommodate the expansion of the penis during erection, at the risk of significant discomfort for the wearer. After initial healing the piercing can be stretched and larger jewelry can be inserted, reaching sizes above 10 mm in diameter.

References

External links 
 More information on the ampallang

Penis piercings